Mudd is a surname. Notable people with the surname include:

 Daniel Mudd (born 1956), American CEO, son of Roger Mudd
 David Mudd (1933–2020), English politician
 Harvey Seeley Mudd (1888–1955), American mining engineer, namesake of Harvey Mudd College
 Henry T. Mudd (1913–1990), American CEO and philanthropist, son of Harvey Seeley Mudd
 Howard Mudd (1942–2020), American football player and coach
 Jodie Mudd (born 1960), American professional golfer
 Lee Mudd (born 1981), Northern Irish footballer
 Richard Mudd (1901–2002), grandson of Samuel Mudd
 Robert H. Mudd (1875–1904), American football player and coach
 Roger Mudd (1928–2021), American television journalist
 Samuel Mudd (1833–1883), American physician who set John Wilkes Booth's broken leg
 Seeley G. Mudd (1895–1968), California physician whose foundation allowed for the construction of several academic halls in U.S. colleges and universities
 Seeley W. Mudd (1861–1926), American mining engineer, father of Harvey Seeley Mudd and Seeley G. Mudd
 Stuart Mudd (1893–1975), American physician and profess of microbiology
 William A. Mudd (1830-1879), British lichenologist

Fictional characters
 Harry Mudd, who appears in Star Trek: The Original Series and Star Trek: The Animated Series
 Lt. Mudd, in Joseph Heller's novel Catch-22
 Millicent Mudd, in the webcomic Ozy and Millie

See also
 Mudd Club
 Harvey Mudd College
 Puddle of Mudd, American band
 "Mr. Mudd and Mr. Gold", a song by Townes Van Zandt
 Mud (disambiguation)